V for Vendetta is a 2006 dystopian thriller film directed by first-time filmmaker James McTeigue with a screenplay written by the Wachowski sisters. The film was produced by the latter and Joel Silver. It is based on the comic book series of the same name by Alan Moore and David Lloyd. It starred Natalie Portman, Hugo Weaving, Stephen Rea, and John Hurt. The film had its world premiere at the Berlin International Film Festival on February 12, 2006. It was released March 17, 2006 in the United States, United Kingdom, and six other countries; it topped that week's US box office. Its worldwide gross was $132,511,035.

V for Vendetta garnered various awards and nominations following its release, with most nominations recognizing the film overall. In addition, V for Vendetta was included in a number of best film lists for 2006, including a list authored by director Kevin Smith. Fandomania named the character V the 96th greatest fictional character of all time.

Awards and nominations

See also

 2006 in film

References
General

Specific

External links
 

Lists of accolades by film
Accolades